Pokr Sariar is a village in the Ashotsk Municipality of the Shirak Province of Armenia. The village was populated by Azerbaijanis before the exodus of Azerbaijanis from Armenia after the outbreak of the Nagorno-Karabakh conflict.

Demographics

References 

Populated places in Shirak Province